Truro 27A is a Mi'kmaq reserve located in Colchester County, Nova Scotia.

It is administratively part of the Millbrook First Nation.

References
Millbrook first Nation

Indian reserves in Nova Scotia
Communities in Colchester County
Mi'kmaq in Canada